Patan is a town and a nagar panchayat in Durg district in the Indian state of Chhattisgarh.The incumbent Chief Minister of Chhattisgarh, Bhupesh Baghel belongs to Patan.

Geography
It has an average elevation of 280 metres (918 feet).

Demographics
 India census, Patan had a population of 8,698. Males constitute 51% of the population and females 49%. Patan has an average literacy rate of 68%, higher than the national average of 59.5%: male literacy is 77%, and female literacy is 59%. In Patan, 14% of the population is under 6 years of age.

History
Patan was a hotbed of Indian freedom struggle. Sri M. P Sawarni, Lakhan Lal Kashyap, Uday Ram Verma, Uday Ram Dikoria and many others from this region were involved in freedom struggle against the British Raj.

Education
Patan High School was built sometime around 1953.

References 

Cities and towns in Durg district